The 1974 British Commonwealth Games were held in Christchurch, New Zealand from 24 January to 2 February 1974. The bid vote was held in Edinburgh at the 1970 British Commonwealth Games. The Games were officially named "the friendly games". There were 1,276 competitors and 372 officials, according to the official history, and public attendance was excellent. The main venue was the QEII Park, purpose-built for this event. The Athletics Stadium and fully covered Olympic standard pool, diving tank, and practice pools were all on the one site. The theme song was "Join Together", sung by Steve Allen. The Games were held after the 1974 Commonwealth Paraplegic Games in Dunedin for wheelchair athletes.

Host selection

Preparation

Security 
The Games were the first large international athletic event after the murder of Israeli athletes at the 1972 Munich Olympics. The Athletes Village, the Student accommodation of the University of Canterbury, was temporarily fenced in and guarded for the duration of the games. Only official vehicles and persons were allowed into sensitive areas around the venues.

Logo 
The logo was the second (after Edinburgh) to be protected and trademarked, and set a design benchmark which was echoed in the logos of the next five games. The logo was designed by Wellington designer Colin Simons as the result of a design competition, and posters were designed by Bret de Thier.

In recent years the logo has been regarded as one of New Zealand's iconic symbols, being reproduced on clothing and elsewhere.

Venues 
 Queen Elizabeth II Park – ceremonies, athletics, diving, swimming
 Cowles Stadium – badminton
 Woolston Working Men's Club – bowls
 Canterbury Court – boxing
 Denton Park – track cycling
 Christchurch Town Hall – weightlifting, wrestling
 McLeans Island – shooting (smallbore)
 West Melton – shooting (largebore)
 Yaldhurst – shooting (trap)
 Cashmere/Beckenham/Huntsbury – road cycling
 University of Canterbury – athlete's village

Opening ceremony

The opening ceremony was held in the mid afternoon, with Prince Philip as the attending royal. A fanfare announced the guard of honour by the New Zealand Defence Forces, inspected by Prince Philip. This was followed by the raising of flags of the past, present, and future hosts. God Save the Queen was sung. The field was then invaded by 2500 school children in red, white and blue rain slicks all forming in the centre to create the NZ74 symbol. The official promotional song, 'Join Together', composed especially for the games by Steve Allen, was performed by a mass choir, as well as 'What the world needs now is love'. A Māori concert group then performed action songs and a haka, before the teams march past. The athletes then took the oath and Sylvia Potts, the runner who fell mere meters from a gold medal finish in the 1970 Games, entered the stadium with the Queen's Baton. It was presented to Prince Philip who read the message from the Queen declaring the 1974 Christchurch 10th British Commonwealth Games open. The Commonwealth flag was then marched in and hauled up with a 21 gun salute.

Broadcasting
The Games were also an important milestone in New Zealand television, marking the introduction of colour television. However, due to the NZBC's limited colour facilities, only athletics, swimming, and boxing could be broadcast in colour.

Meanwhile, paralleling the Television coverage, the National Film Unit produced Games '74, a fine feature-length documentary of the Christchurch games (and the many events) in full colour. This has since been restored and is available on DVD.

Legacy

Economic aspects 

Christchurch was (and still is) the smallest city to host the modern televised Commonwealth Games. This was the first games that tried using the "Olympic" look with a standard colour scheme for facilities, passes, flags, stationery, and above all uniforms (which wearers only borrowed, but could buy outright as a memento thus helping keep costs down).

Its striking NZ74 design logo is now a well used (sometimes illegally) symbol of New Zealand as a nation and Christchurch as a city. It is still copyright owned by Christchurch City Council but is allowed for free use unless for commercial gain. Badges, lapels, stationery and postcards are still in re-manufactured circulation.

This was also the first time that a city had asked the Games Federation to allow commercial advertising. This was voted down as the Federation feared that advertising by big corporations would remove focus away from the amateur ethos of the Games. As no commercial hoardings were allowed, Christchurch got around this with the use of "sponsorship", one example being General Motors providing a lease fleet of Holden HQ Kingswood sedans that would be sold off after the games. The cars are now sought after by private and museum collectors and have depreciated little in value.
Air New Zealand allowed large NZ74 symbols to be placed on the fuselage sides of the airline's brand new McDonnell Douglas DC-10s, giving free advertising around the world. This in itself set a trend since with airlines vying to be "official airline" of a particular event.

Although the Games themselves were a success, making a then sizable profit of $500,000, the "sponsorship" was nowhere near enough. The City of Christchurch was left with a financial facilities management debt (QEII Park) of what would be in today's (2016) amount of NZ$120 million. This deterred the city from hosting major events until 1990 when the government stepped in with lotteries funding to clear the remaining debt. By then, Auckland's 1990 games had been fully commercialized.

Queen Elizabeth II Park
The most visible facility left behind by the 1974 Commonwealth Games was the purpose-built stadium and swimming complex. For a few years after, the stadium was a popular destination for sports and leisure patrons who were well indulged in first class facilities. However the costs of maintaining the complex grew over time and soon other additions included hydro-slides and fun park outside on the large grassed area that was once the race course. Christchurch City Council, the owner of the complex continued to develop the ground and for five years from 1990, allowed the Canterbury Greyhound Club to run a track on the inner oval. The main swimming pool was adapted so it could be decked over for Basketball and Netball. Football and Rugby League returned to the stadium in 1995 on a more permanent basis and a minor refurbishment of the track saw athletics events become a main summer event again. Early plans for a hosting of the 2022 Commonwealth Games were in hand when the September 2010 earthquake of around 7.1 hit near Christchurch and damaged the facility. Assessors immediately reported that the damage was repairable and could be covered by insurance. The swimming pools were drained to await repair when the more devastating 22 February 2011 earthquake struck Christchurch, damaging the entire facility, already weakened, beyond economic repair.  After laying abandoned for three years, the stadium was demolished and by 2016 the ground stabilized in preparation of more economical facilities and a connecting high school.

Future 2026/2030 Bids proposals
As a rebuilding legacy, there have been calls for Christchurch to bid for the new style Commonwealth Games that allow a core central city to host a more nationwide event. This has been seen as a more economical format for smaller cities, and countries to host what had become an expensive event for a singular city to host.

Precedents set 
While the opening ceremony was a regimented and very formal affair, the late afternoon closing ceremony was anything but.  
This set a precedent for other closing ceremonies since then. With the formalities out of the way, the handing over of the flag to representatives of Edmonton, Alberta, Canada, the athletes broke ranks and ran amok, much to the delight of the packed stadium and the Queen herself. A flypast of the then Red Checkers RNZAF display team brought the ceremony to a close as the Queen and Prince Philip did a lap of honour around the stadium and departed.

The youngest competitor at the games was New Zealander Rebecca Perrott, 12; swimming for Fiji at the games, as her father was Registrar at the University of the South Pacific.

Participating teams 

38 teams were represented at the 1974 Games.(Teams competing for the first time are shown in bold).

Medals by country

Medals by event

Athletics

Badminton

Bowls

Boxing

Cycling

Track

Road

Diving

Shooting

Pistol

Rifle

Shotgun

Swimming
Men's events

Women's events

Weightlifting

Wrestling

See also
The Games Affair
Sir Ron Scott

Footnotes

References
Official History of the Xth British Commonwealth Games edited by A. R. Cant (1974, Christchurch)

External links
 Commonwealth Games Official Site
 1974 Games on Australian Commonwealth Games official website
 Games 74 – a full-length documentary film of the 1974 Commonwealth Games in Christchurch on NZ On Screen

 
Commonwealth Games in New Zealand
Commonwealth Games
Commonwealth Games by year
International sports competitions hosted by New Zealand
1970s in Christchurch
Sports competitions in Christchurch
Commonwealth Games
1974 in the British Empire
January 1974 sports events in New Zealand
February 1974 sports events in New Zealand
1970s in New Zealand